Colleyville is a city in northeastern Tarrant County, Texas, United States, centrally located in the Dallas–Fort Worth metroplex. A wealthy suburb of the Dallas/Fort Worth area, Colleyville was originally a small farm town in the 19th century. The population was 22,807 at the 2010 census.

History
Emerging from a number of small, rural settlements along the Cotton Belt Route, Colleyville was originally known as Bransford when Dr. Lilburn Howard Colley settled there in 1880. He was a prominent area physician and a veteran of the Union Army. In 1914, when Walter G. Couch opened a grocery store near Dr. Colley's home, the community was renamed Colleyville in his honor.

On January 15, 2022, a hostage crisis occurred at Congregation Beth Israel, a synagogue in Colleyville. Four hostages were held for a number of hours before police shot and killed the perpetrator. The FBI said it was investigating the incident as a "federal hate crime" and an "act of terrorism".

Geography

Colleyville is located at  (32.885062, –97.149233).

According to the United States Census Bureau, the city has a total area of 13.1 square miles (33.9 km2), with approximately 0.08% of its area as water.

Demographics

2020 Census

As of the 2020 United States census, there were 26,057 people, 9,249 households, and 8,084 families residing in the city.

2010 Census
As of the 2010 census, there were 22,807 people, 7,913 households, and 7,001 families residing in the city. The population density was 1,741.0 people per square mile (672.8/km2). There were 8,165 housing units at an average density of 623.3/sq mi (240.9/km2). The racial makeup of the city was 88.9% White, 2.0% African American, 0.5% Native American, 5.9% Asian, 0.0% Pacific Islander, 0.8% from other races, and 1.9% from two or more races. Hispanic or Latino of any race were 5.1% of the population.

There were 7,913 households, out of which 40.1% had families with children under the age of 18 living with them, 81.6% were married couples living together, 2.1% had a male householder with no wife present, 4.8% had a female householder with no husband present, and 11.5% were non-families. 9.5% of all households were made up of individuals, and 3.4% had someone living alone who was 65 years of age or older. The average household size was 2.88 and the average family size was 3.08.

The population was spread out, with 26.5% under the age of 18, 5.7% from 18 to 24, 16.9% from 25 to 44, 40.5% from 45 to 64, and 10.4% who were 65 years of age or older. The median age was 45.5 years. For every 100 females, there were 98.4 males. For every 100 females age 18 and over, there were 97.0 males.

Recent statistics
The population of Colleyville, according to a 2017 Census estimate, was 26,674.

The same estimate found that the median household income was $162,183, while the average household income was $207,438. The per capita income for the city was $72,927. About 1.9% of the population were below the poverty line. In 2018, data from the American Community Survey ranked Colleyville as the 10th wealthiest city in the United States.

Colleyville is consistently ranked as the safest city in Texas, and, in 2018, was named the 11th safest city in the United States.

26.6% of residents hold a bachelor's degree or higher, ranking as the highest percentage in the state and the 51st in the nation.

Economy

Top employers

Government

Municipal government
Colleyville uses a council–manager government, consisting of an elected city council composed of the mayor and six at-large councilmembers and a city manager appointed by the council.  The current city manager is Jerry Ducay.

The city is a voluntary member of the North Central Texas Council of Governments.

Colleyville City Council

2017 financial report
According to the city's 2017 Comprehensive Annual Financial Report, the city's various funds had $42.4 million in revenues, $35.1 million in expenditures, $221.5 million in total assets, $19.5 million in total liabilities, and $57.5 million in cash and investments.

Politics
Colleyville, located in the conservative stronghold of northeastern Tarrant County, votes overwhelmingly Republican in all elections, as do most suburban cities in the Dallas–Fort Worth metroplex.

Tarrant County officials

Texas Legislature

The city almost entirely lies within the boundaries of Texas House District 98 and Texas Senate District 10, with a few houses lying within Texas House District 92 and Texas Senate District 9.

Texas State Board of Education

United States House of Representatives

Education

Grapevine-Colleyville Independent School District serves most of the city. The district operates eleven elementary schools (pre-kindergarten through 5th grade), four middle schools (6th–8th grades), and two high schools (9th–12th grades). Colleyville Heritage High School and Grapevine High School both draw students from different areas of Colleyville.

Northwestern Colleyville lies inside Keller Independent School District, which maintains one campus within the city. Birdville Independent School District, Carroll Independent School District, and Hurst-Euless-Bedford Independent School District also serve small portions of Colleyville.

Colleyville Covenant Christian Academy is a private religious school serving pre-kindergarten through 12th grade and is a fully accredited member of the Texas Association of Private and Parochial Schools.

Transportation

Roads and highways
Two Texas state highways run through city limits. Texas State Highway 121 runs along a portion of the eastern edge of Colleyville, while Texas State Highway 26, also known as Colleyville Boulevard or Grapevine Highway, bisects the city, running southwest to northeast. The speed limit on every road in the city is 30 mph, excluding the 45 mph speed limit on Highway 26 set by TxDOT.

Rail
The Grapevine Vintage Railroad runs through the city along the former Cotton Belt Route right-of-way, offering rides on vintage locomotives from downtown Grapevine to downtown Fort Worth. Commuter rail service began on January 10, 2019, with the introduction of TEXRail, offering service from Fort Worth to DFW Airport through Northeast Tarrant County. Due to immense opposition from the Colleyville City Council and residents, the commuter train does not stop in Colleyville, so the closest stations are the North Richland Hills/Smithfield station to the west and the Grapevine station to the east.

Airports
Two major airports serve passengers in the Metroplex. Dallas/Fort Worth International Airport, one of the busiest airports in the world, provides airline services to over 200 destinations. American Airlines, headquartered nearby in Fort Worth, maintains its largest hub at DFW. Colleyville has experienced significant population growth because of its proximity to the airport. Dallas Love Field, in Northwest Dallas, is home to the headquarters of Southwest Airlines and serves as a focus city for the airline.

Trails
The Cotton Belt Trail is an eleven-mile bicyclist and pedestrian trail that lies parallel to the former Cotton Belt Route railroad through Grapevine, Colleyville, Hurst, and North Richland Hills, with 3.4 miles running through Colleyville. The Colleyville Nature Center also provides a 1.25 mile hiking trail.

Notable people
 Bryce Avary, The Rocket Summer
 Konni Burton, former Texas State Senator and businesswoman
 Chad Campbell, PGA golfer
 Greg Chalmers, PGA golfer
 Maxx Crosby, NFL defensive end for Las Vegas Raiders 
 Rusty Greer, former MLB left fielder for Texas Rangers
 Josh Hamilton, Texas Rangers outfielder
 Demi Lovato, actress and singer
 Frank Lucchesi, Major League Baseball manager 
 Hunter Mahan, PGA golfer
 Katie Meili, Olympic swimmer 
 Rafael Palmeiro, former Texas Rangers and Baltimore Orioles first baseman
 Ryan Palmer, PGA Tour golfer
 Christian Ponder, Minnesota Vikings quarterback, alumnus of CHHS 
 John Rollins, PGA golfer
 Bobby Witt Jr., MLB shortstop for Kansas City Royals

References

External links
 
 City of Colleyville official website
 Grapevine/Colleyville community website (OurGreatCity.com)
 Colleyville Chamber of Commerce
 Colleyville Courier newspaper
 Historic photos of Colleyville hosted by the Portal to Texas History

Cities in Tarrant County, Texas
Cities in Texas
 
Dallas–Fort Worth metroplex